Tamás Somló (17 November 1947 – 19 July 2016) was a Hungarian musician, singer-songwriter and artist. He is mostly known for having been a member of Hungarian rock bands Omega and Locomotiv GT and for composing several of their successful songs. Besides being a singer, his main instruments were bass guitar, clarinet, and the saxophone.

He died of cancer on 19 July 2016 at the age of 68. It was after this that the remaining members of his longtime band Locomotiv GT announced that they will stop performing together, which also meant the band's dissolution.

Awards
 Order of Merit of the Republic of Hungary (2004)

References

External links 
 Official website (Hungarian)
 http://www.blikk.hu/sztarvilag/somlo-tamas-37-eve-nem-tud-elvalni-a-felesegetol/fpsrd21

1947 births
2016 deaths
Hungarian musicians
Hungarian Jews
Locomotiv GT members
Deaths from cancer in Hungary